Saturnus may refer to:
 Saturn (mythology), a Roman god whose Latin name was Saturnus
 Saturnus (band), a band from Denmark
 Saturnus (butterfly), a genus of butterflies in the grass skipper family
 Saturn, a planet in the Solar System
 BK Saturnus, a Swedish football club